Alena Černáková (born 8 August 1961) is a Czech gymnast. She competed for Czechoslovakia in six events at the 1976 Summer Olympics.

References

External links
 
 

1961 births
Living people
Czech female artistic gymnasts
Olympic gymnasts of Czechoslovakia
Gymnasts at the 1976 Summer Olympics
Sportspeople from Plzeň